H-8 is a sector of Islamabad. The sector is bounded by Srinagar Highway and G-8 to the north, Islamabad Expressway and Shakarparian to the east, I-8 to the south, Ninth Avenue and H-9 to the west. 

Similar to other H-sectors, H-8 is provided for education and health facilities.

Subdivisions
H-8 is a square-shaped sector. It has been further divided into 4 sub-sectors:
H-8/1
H-8/2
H-8/3 (H-8 graveyard)
H-8/4

Services and facilities

Educational 
The sector houses both public and private schools, colleges, and universities.

Board office 
Federal Board of Intermediate and Secondary Education (FBISE)

Special education 
National Institute of Special Education (NISE)
Fatima Jinnah Special Education Centre
Ibn-e-Sina Special Education Centre
Vocational Rehabilitation & Employment of Disabled Persons

Schools and colleges 
Islamabad Convent School H-8/4 Campus
City School Capital Campus
Beaconhouse Margalla Campus
Roots International Schools Wellington Campus and headoffice
Sheikh Zayed International Academy 
OPF Boys school and college
Westminster Academy H-8 Campus
Joan McDonald School
Pak-Turk Maarif International Schools & Colleges H-8 Campus
LGS Islamabad Campus

Higher education and specialization institutes 
Polytechnical Institute for Women
WAPDA Staff Training College
Women's Institute of Science & Humanities
Federal Judicial Academy
Shifa College of Medicine
Islamabad Model Postgraduate College Of Commerce
Islamabad Model Postgraduate College

Universities 
Allama Iqbal Open University
SZABIST Islamabad Campus 
National Skills University
Shifa Tameer-e-Millat University
Preston University Islamabad Campus

Health

Hospitals

Shifa International Hospital

Cemeteries

H-8 Graveyard

Religious
Islamabad Capital Territory's only Bahá'í center is also located in this sector. Shoba Das of Minority Rights Group International reported in 2013 that there were around 200 Baha’is that live in Islamabad.

See also
Sectors of Islamabad
F-6, Islamabad
F-8, Islamabad
H-12, Islamabad
I-10, Islamabad

References 

Sectors of Islamabad